Ersin is a Turkish given name for males and a surname. It may refer to:

Given name 
 Ersin Demir (born 1977), Turkish football player
 Ersin Destanoğlu (born 2001), Turkish football player
 Ersin Durgut (born 1982), Turkish volleyball player
 Ersin Erçin, Turkish diplomat
 Ersin Güreler (born 1978), Turkish football player
 Ersin Kalaycıoğlu, Turkish political scientist
 Ersin Kaya (born 1993), Australian football player
 Ersin Mehmedović (born 1981), Serbian football player
 Ersin Tacir (born 1985), Turkish race walker
 Ersin Tatar (born 1960), Turkish Cypriot politician and current president of Northern Cyprus

Surname 
 Fahir Ersin (1929–1988), Turkish journalist
 Nurettin Ersin (1918–2005), Turkish general

Turkish masculine given names
Turkish-language surnames